Moosebumps: An Exploration Into Modern Day Horripilation is the fifteenth solo studio album by American recording artist Kool Keith, who released the album under the alias Dr. Octagon. It was released on April 6, 2018 via Bulk Recordings. The set was produced by Dan "The Automator" Nakamura and featured the work of turntablist DJ Qbert.

Track listing

Personnel
Keith Matthew Thornton – vocals
Paul Julian Banks – vocals (track 8)
Teren Delvon Jones – vocals (track 9)
Alex Swain – guitar, keyboards, drums, engineering
Gary Wayne Holt – guitar (tracks: 4, 10)
Merlo Podlewski – bass
John Peter Alderete – bass
Richard Quitevis – scratches
Eric San – scratches (track 9)
Daniel M. Nakamura – production, mixing
Gordon Chumway – engineering
Howie Weinberg – mastering

Charts

References

External links

Moosebumps: An Exploration Into Modern Day Horripilation at iTunes

2018 albums
Kool Keith albums
Albums produced by Dan the Automator